A red herring is a figurative expression referring to a logical fallacy in which a clue or piece of information is or is intended to be misleading, or distracting from the actual question.

Red herring may also refer to:

Animals
 Red herring (fish), a type of kipper made from dried, smoked, and salted fish

Art, entertainment, and media
 Red Herring (magazine), a former magazine focused on new technology businesses; now a website devoted to same
 Red Herring, a character in the cartoon series A Pup Named Scooby-Doo
 Red Herring, a 2012 film starring Holly Valance
 Red Herring (play), a 2000 play by Michael Hollinger
 "Red Herring", a trance single by the band Union Jack
 Red Herring Artists, an artist's collective based in Brighton, England
 Boxer James Red Herring was also known in the ring simply as Red Herring.

Business
 Red herring prospectus, a preliminary financial prospectus offering a new stock (in red type)
 Red Herring Surf, a brand of surfwear in Tasmania, Australia